These are the films shown at the 9th New York Underground Film Festival, held from March 6–12, 2002.

See also
 New York Underground Film Festival site
 2002 Festival Archive

New York Underground Film Festival
Underground Film Festival
2002 film festivals
New York Underground Film
2002 in American cinema